Liam James McCarron (born 7 March 2001) is a professional footballer who plays as a winger for  club Port Vale, on loan from  club Stoke City. Born in England, McCarron has represented Scotland at under-19 level.

McCarron turned professional at Carlisle United in September 2018 and played twenty first-team games before he was sold to Leeds United in July 2019. He made his Premier League debut in December 2021 and was sold on to Stoke City in June 2022. He was loaned out to Port Vale for the 2022–23 season.

Club career

Carlisle United
McCarron was born in Preston and grew up in Appleby-in-Westmorland. After coming through the academy at Carlisle United, McCarron broke into the first team under manager John Sheridan, making his first-team debut in the EFL Trophy on 4 September 2018, coming on as an 83rd-minute substitute for Ashley Nadesan in a 3–2 win over Morecambe at Brunton Park. He made his debut in League Two eleven days later, in a 2–0 home defeat to Tranmere Rovers. Later that month he signed an 18-month contract, with the option of a further year. He was given his first start in a 3–1 defeat at Sunderland in an EFL Trophy group stage game on 9 October. He was handed his first league start by caretaker-managers Tommy Wright and Paul Murray on 12 January, in a 3–0 defeat at Northampton Town, and retained his place in the starting eleven for the next two matches under new manager Steven Pressley. He ended the 2018–19 season with four starts and sixteen substitute appearances to his name. He turned down an improved contract offer from the club.

Leeds United
McCarron signed for Leeds United for an undisclosed fee on 1 July 2019, agreeing a three-year deal at the club. He signed a new two-year contract with the club in September 2021. Marcelo Bielsa gave McCarron his Premier League debut at Elland Road on 18 December, sending him on as a second half substitute in a 4–1 defeat to Arsenal. This proved to be his only first-team appearance for the club, in addition to three EFL Trophy appearances for the under-21s.

Stoke City
On 29 June 2022, McCarron joined Stoke City on a three-year contract for an undisclosed fee. He was told by manager Michael O'Neill that he "would be given a chance to play in the first team", however O'Neill was sacked on 25 August. On 1 September, McCarron joined League One side Port Vale on loan for the 2022–23 season; he became the first Stoke player to be loaned directly to Potteries derby rivals Port Vale since March 1978.

International career
McCarron was added to the Scotland under-19 squad in February 2020 and won one cap. On 21 August 2020, McCarron was called up to the Scotland under-21 squad for the first time.

Style of play
Carlisle academy manager Darren Edmondson described McCarron as a "pacey" winger with "a high work rate". He is also able to play at left-back or left-wing back. McCarron describes his own main strength as "running with the ball".

Career statistics

References

2001 births
Living people
Footballers from Preston, Lancashire
People from Appleby-in-Westmorland
Footballers from Cumbria
Scottish footballers
Scotland youth international footballers
English footballers
English people of Scottish descent
Carlisle United F.C. players
Leeds United F.C. players
Stoke City F.C. players
Port Vale F.C. players
English Football League players
Premier League players
Association football wingers
Association football fullbacks